Grupo Desportivo e Cultural do Correio da Manhã was a Portuguese sports club based in Lisbon. Founded in 1981 by employees of the newspaper Correio da Manhã, the club was better known for its futsal team whose greater successes included two Portuguese Futsal League wins and one Portuguese Futsal Cup. The futsal team ceased playing after the 2003–04 season ceding its spot in the league to Estrela da Amadora.

Former players

References

External links
 Zerozero

Futsal clubs in Portugal
Sports clubs established in 1981
1981 establishments in Portugal